The Abyss Boys  is a 2009 short film directed by Jan-Hendrik Beetge. It won the Best Short Film award at the 6th Africa Movie Academy Awards.

Synopsis 
Set in the slums of a small fishing community on the southern coast of South Africa, illegal abalone poaching has become a dangerous activity for two young brothers: Jimmy and AB. Jimmy fled the dangerous lifestyle despite his talent as a diver. When AB becomes entangled with Gonyama, a violent gangster, Jimmy devises a plan to liberate AB from the gang lifestyle and provide the pair with a fresh start. However, when Jimmy is given an opportunity to escape, nothing can prepare him for what comes next.

Awards 
African Movie Academy Awards 2010

References

External links

2009 films
Best Short Film Africa Movie Academy Award winners
South African short films
2009 short films